Fred Nicholson (September 1, 1894 in Honey Grove, Texas – January 23, 1972 in Kilgore, Texas), was a Major League Baseball player who played outfielder from -. He would play for the Pittsburgh Pirates, Boston Braves, and Detroit Tigers.

Despite never playing fulltime, Nicholson proved to be a good contact hitter in an era where pitchers tended to dominate in stats.  With the Pirates in 1920, Nicholson would finish the season with an astounding .360 batting average in 271 plate appearances.  Amazingly, despite such abilities with the bat, Pittsburgh would trade him in January of 1921 to the Braves where he would end up batting .327 in 272 plate appearances.  Nicholson would regress in 1922, batting just .252 and then leave pro baseball for ten years, before returning in the minor leagues from 1932 to 1935.  Nevertheless, Nicholson's career .311 batting average in 891 plate appearances was exceptional during the period in which he played.

External links

1894 births
1972 deaths
Major League Baseball outfielders
Baseball players from Texas
Pittsburgh Pirates players
Detroit Tigers players
Boston Braves players
Dallas Giants players
Wichita Falls Drillers players
Hugo Hugoites players
Hugo Scouts players
Denison Champions players
San Antonio Bronchos players
Denison Railroaders players
Charlotte Hornets (baseball) players
Chattanooga Lookouts players
St. Paul Saints (AA) players
Toledo Mud Hens players
Kansas City Blues (baseball) players
Omaha Packers players
Shreveport Sports players
Tyler Sports players
Wichita Aviators players
Oklahoma City Indians players
Baton Rouge Solons players
Paris Pirates players
Lufkin Lumbermen players
Gladewater Bears players
People from Honey Grove, Texas